Corey Wedlock (born 15 June 1996) is an international Australian lawn and indoor bowler.

Bowls career
Corey made his international debut in 2017 and has twice won the pairs with Nathan Pedersen at the Hong Kong International Bowls Classic in 2015 and 2016.

In 2020 he was selected for the 2020 World Outdoor Bowls Championship in Australia.

In 2021, Wedlock won the delayed triples title with Gary Kelly and Brendan Aquilina at the delayed Australian National Bowls Championships. The following day he also won the fours title with Aquilina, Jamie Turner and Aaron Teys.

In 2022, he competed in the men's pairs and the men's fours at the 2022 Commonwealth Games.

References

Australian male bowls players
1996 births
Living people
20th-century Australian people
21st-century Australian people
Bowls players at the 2022 Commonwealth Games